Sandilipay is a town located 10 km from the City of Jaffna, Sri Lanka. The original name of Sandilipay is Kalvalai.
It is the home of :
 Kalvalai Pillaiyar Temple (renowned for its poetic work Kalvalai Anthathi, written by Sinnathamby Pulavar)
 Seerani Nagapoosani Amman Temple
 Jaffna's one and only river, Valukkai aaru.

References 

Towns in Jaffna District
Valikamam South West DS Division